Roman Jebavý and Andrej Martin were the defending champions but chose not to defend their title.

Sander Arends and Antonio Šančić won the title after defeating Aliaksandr Bury and Kevin Krawietz 7–6(7–1), 6–2 in the final.

Seeds

Draw

References
 Main Draw

Città di Como Challenger - Doubles
2017 Doubles